Return may refer to:

In business, economics, and finance
 Return on investment (ROI), the financial gain after an expense.
 Rate of return, the financial term for the profit or loss derived from an investment
 Tax return, a blank document or template supplied by a government for use in the reporting of tax information
 Product return, the process of bringing back merchandise to a retailer for a refund or exchange
 Returns (economics), the benefit distributed to the owner of a factor of production
 Abnormal return, denoting the difference in behaviour between one stock and the overall stock market
 Taxes, where tax returns are forms submitted to taxation authorities

In technology
 Return (architecture), the receding edge of a flat face
 Carriage return, a key on an alphanumeric keyboard commonly equated with the "enter" key
 Return statement, a computer programming statement that ends a subroutine and resumes execution where the subroutine was called
 Return code, a method of messaging status in software
 Aux-return, the input complement of an Aux-send output
 "Return", synonym of "register", "grille" in HVAC system

In entertainment

Film 
 Return (1954 film), a Hong Kong film directed by Lee Dut
 Return (1985 film), a film directed by Andrew Silver
 The Return (2003 film), a Russian film directed by Andrey Zvyagintsev 
 Wide Awake (2007 film), a South Korean film also known as Return
 Return (2010 film), a short film directed by Harri J. Rantala
 Return (2011 film), an independent film directed by Liza Johnson
 Return (2018 film), documentary film directed by

Music 
 Return (iKon album)
 Return (Jack DeJohnette album)
 Return, an album by David Rovics
 Return (band), a Norwegian 80s pop/rock band
 "Return", a song by OK Go from the 2002 album OK Go
 "Return", a song by Shed Seven from album Let It Ride
 "Return", a song by The Wedding from the 2008 EP The Sound, The Steel
 "Return", a single by Natalie Hemby from Puxico (album) (2017)
 Returns (album), a 2009 album by Return to Forever
 Return (EP), a 2011 EP by F.T. Island

Other 
 "Return" (Law & Order), a 2000 episode of Law & Order
 "Return" (The Secret Circle), 2012
 The Returns, a 2009 ballet by William Forsythe
 Return (TV series), a 2018 South Korean TV series
 Return (Polish TV series) a 2022 Polish TV series

In politics
 Return (Transnistria), a European political party
 Election returns, denoting the resulting tallies of election ballots

People
 Return J. Meigs, Sr. (1740–1823), American Revolutionary War officer, federal Indian agent
 Return J. Meigs, Jr. (1764–1825), Governor of Ohio, U.S. Postmaster General
 Return Torrey (1835–1893), American politician

Other
 Return Point, Antarctica
 In gridiron football (American or Canadian), "return" can refer to either:
Kickoff return
Punt return
 Nostoi ("Returns"), a lost ancient Greek epic
 Diminishing returns, referring to a decrease of efficiency with scaling

See also
 The Return (disambiguation)
 Return channel